James Ford (May 4, 1783 – August 18, 1859) was a Jacksonian member of the U.S. House of Representatives from Pennsylvania.

Biography
James Ford was born in Perth Amboy, New Jersey.  He moved to New York City in 1797 and to Lindsley Town (later Lindley, New York) in 1803.  He moved to Tioga County, Pennsylvania, and was elected a member of the Pennsylvania House of Representatives in 1824 and 1825.

Ford was elected as a Jacksonian to the Twenty-first and Twenty-second Congresses.  He operated a sawmill and a gristmill at Lawrenceville, Pennsylvania, until his death at that place in 1859.  Interment in the old Lindsley family cemetery at Lindley, New York.

The James Ford House is a house he had built for his son in 1831.  It was listed on the National Register of Historic Places in 1975.

Sources

The Political Graveyard

Members of the Pennsylvania House of Representatives
1783 births
1859 deaths
Jacksonian members of the United States House of Representatives from Pennsylvania
19th-century American politicians